Commune is the second studio album by Swedish experimental fusion group Goat. It was released worldwide on 22 September 2014 by Rocket Recordings, in North America on 23 September by Sub Pop, and in Scandinavia on 24 September by Stranded Records. The group also embarked on a small promotional tour across Europe in support of the album, which began on September 19 in Copenhagen, Denmark and ended on October 3 at the Roundhouse in London, England.

Track listing

Reception

Commune received generally favorable reviews, with a score of 76/100 on Metacritic. The album was listed on several publications' best albums of 2014 lists.

Accolades

Charts

References

2014 albums
Goat (band) albums
Sub Pop albums